This list of 2015 NFL draft early entrants consists of college football players who forfeited remaining collegiate eligibility and were declared by the National Football League (NFL) as eligible to be selected in the 2015 NFL draft. This includes juniors and redshirt sophomores who completed high school at least three years prior to the draft. A player that meets these requirements can renounce his remaining NCAA eligibility and enter the draft. Players had until January 15, 2015, to declare their intention to forgo their remaining collegiate eligibility.

In addition to the 74 underclassmen, ten players who had already received degrees opted not to pursue an additional season of college eligibility for which they may have been eligible. These players are included in the list below, bringing the total number of players entering the draft with eligibility remaining to 84.

Complete list of players

The following players were granted special eligibility to enter the 2015 draft:

Number of players granted special eligibility by year
Undergraduates admitted to the NFL draft each year:

References

External links 
 NFL draft website

2015 NFL draft early entrants
Draft early entrants
NFL Draft early entrants